Launaea crepoides is a species of flowering plant in the family Asteraceae. It is found only in Yemen. Its natural habitats are subtropical or tropical dry forests and subtropical or tropical dry shrubland.

References

crepoides
Endemic flora of Socotra
Vulnerable plants
Taxonomy articles created by Polbot
Taxa named by Isaac Bayley Balfour